Adath Israel or Adas Israel  ( "Congregation/Community of Israel") may refer to the following Jewish synagogues:

Canada
 Adath Israel Congregation (Toronto), Conservative synagogue

United States
 Adas Israel Congregation (Washington, D.C.), Conservative synagogue
 Lillian & Albert Small Jewish Museum Washington, D.C., also known as Adas Israel Synagogue
 Congregation Adath Israel (Rutland), commonly known as the Rutland Jewish Center, a synagogue in Rutland, Virginia
 Congregation Adath Israel Brith Sholom, Reform synagogue
 Adath Israel Temple (Louisville, Kentucky), former synagogue in Louisville, Kentucky, listed on the NRHP
 Temple Adath Israel (Owensboro, Kentucky), synagogue in Owensboro, Kentucky
 Temple Adath Israel of the Main Line, Conservative synagogue in Merion, Pennsylvania
 Temple Israel (Boston), originally named Adath Israel
 Adas Israel Congregation (Duluth, Minnesota), a Modern Orthodox Jewish synagogue
 Temple Adath Israel (Cleveland, Mississippi), listed on the NRHP in Mississippi
 Conservative Synagogue Adath Israel of Riverdale, in Bronx, New York
 Temple Adas Israel (Sag Harbor), Reform synagogue in Sag Harbor, New York
 Temple Adas Israel (Brownsville, Tennessee), a historic synagogue
 Congregation Adath Israel (Woodbridge Township, New Jersey), former Conservative synagogue in Woodbridge, New Jersey

See also